Leopold Copeland Parker Cowper (March 1811 – July 17, 1875) served as (seventh) lieutenant governor of the Restored government of Virginia from November 1863 until June 1865 and then as the eighth Lieutenant Governor of the Commonwealth of Virginia from June 1865 until September 1869 under Governors John Letcher, William Smith, Francis Harrison Pierpont and Henry H. Wells.

Early life
Cowper was born in Isle of Wight County, Virginia. His parents separated a year after his birth. In January 1817 his mother, Ann Pierce Parker Cowper, daughter of former congressman Josiah Parker, was granted a legal separation by the Virginia General Assembly, and she received legal custody of her children. Cowper practiced law in Portsmouth and Norfolk County. A Whig, he served two consecutive terms in the Virginia House of Delegates, 1847–1848 and 1848–1849.

Lieutenant Governor
In May 1863 Cowper was selected as candidate for lieutenant governor of the Restored government to replace a candidate from Berkeley County who had withdrawn. Although the candidates for governor and attorney general were unopposed, Cowper was challenged by Gilbert S. Miner, whom he defeated in the election held on May 28, 1863. Although Cowper was not slated to assume his new office until January 1864, Governor Francis Harrison Pierpont appointed him lieutenant governor on November 17, 1863, after the sitting lieutenant governor, Daniel Polsley, resigned. As lieutenant governor, Cowper presided over a state senate that consisted at full strength of six members, representing the districts of Accomack and Northampton Counties, Alexandria and Fairfax Counties, Elizabeth City County and the city of Hampton, Loudoun County, the city of Norfolk, and Norfolk and Princess Anne Counties.

Later life
Cowper died in 1875 and was buried at Macclesfield, his family's estate at Smithfield in Isle of Wight County.

Sources
 John T. Kneebone et al., eds., Dictionary of Virginia Biography (Richmond: The Library of Virginia, 1998-   ), 3:497-499.  

People from Isle of Wight County, Virginia
1811 births
1875 deaths
Lieutenant Governors of Virginia
Members of the Virginia House of Delegates
Virginia lawyers
Virginia Whigs
19th-century American lawyers
19th-century American politicians